The New Zealand TR class locomotive is a type of diesel shunting locomotives built by many different manufacturers. Defined as "shunting tractors" or "rail tractors" by KiwiRail and its predecessors, they are classified "TR" for tractor as a result. Many of these locomotives have been withdrawn, but some are still in service. The first locomotive of this class was built by NZR in 1924. The most powerful were Japanese-built Hitachi TRs, with 138 kW Cummins engines.

Operation
The typical role of a TR was at small stations where a normal shunting locomotive was not needed due to light traffic. NZR's operating rules allowed TRs to be driven by staff who were not members of the locomotive branch, saving on wages. Other roles have included shunting at railway workshops and depots, and most of the remaining locomotives can still be found at these locations. There are very few stations where they are still in use owing to rationalisations of freight terminals, the trend towards containerisation of traffic, and roving shunting services. A number of locomotives have been leased to industrial operators for private siding use.

The last TR was built in 1978, TR 191. The greatly reduced needs of NZR and its successors for this type of locomotive, and industrial requirements being able to be handled by other ex-NZR classes or locomotives obtained from elsewhere has meant no TRs have been added since then. However, four locomotives have been reclassified from other types.

The TR classification has been applied to two former industrial locomotives. One of these is TR 81, which was purchased from the Ohai Railway Board in 1955. Built by the Drewry Car Co in the 1930s, it is similar to the first generation 0-4-0 Drewry TRs but was originally fitted with the Gardner 6LW diesel engine. The other is A&G Price no. 222 which was acquired from Pacific Metal Industries in the early 2000s. It was built in 1968 with a  diesel engine and is of the 0-6-0 wheel arrangement. Originally reclassified DSA 222 it now carries the number TR 1026 and is leased for industrial use.

In the 1990s, EB 26 at Napier was reclassified as TR 1003 and used in the area for shunting work. The EB class were formerly workshops shunting locomotives. The Plains Vintage Railway & Historical Museum of Ashburton, a heritage railway, also reclassified two former industrial locomotives as TR. Although A & G Price built similar locomotives for NZR, plus a J & F Howard's former Public Works Department shunter no. 976. These locomotives were never owned by New Zealand Railways Department or their successors and thus their TR classification and numbers are historically fictitious.

On 16 March 2022 KiwiRail announced the retiring of its oldest locomotive dating from 1936, an 85-year old diesel shunt locomotive TR56, which had been based at the Hutt Workshops since the late 1960s. TR56 was gifted to the Rail Heritage Trust for use on the Silver Stream Railway. The replacement is battery-powered and zero-emission; one of 14 300-tonne and 2 110-tonne battery-powered shunt engines purchased.

Manufacturers

Petone Railway Workshops 

The first TR shunting locomotive built was TR1, constructed at Petone Workshops, New Zealand in July 1924. It was built from a standard Fordson 22 hp tractor, which was attached to a patent underframe supplied by the Adamson Motor Company of Birmingham, Alabama. It was used until the 1940s for light shunting in various parts of the North Island.

Muir-Hill 
In 1928, NZR purchased two small TR locomotives from Muir-Hill Equipment Limited of Manchester. The locomotives were similar to one supplied to the Department of External Affairs for use on the Telefunken Railroad in Samoa. This locomotive was eventually sent to New Zealand to the Department of Public Works, and then handed to NZR in 1940. All examples were written off by 1948.

Muir-Hill and A & G Price 
A further three locomotives were ordered by NZR from A & G Price of Thames in 1930. A&G Price constructed the locomotives to the same design as the two Muir-Hill locomotives previously supplied to NZR. They entered service in 1931. The last one was written off and scrapped in 1950.

Drewry Car Co
The original batch of six 0-4-0 TRs, 13-18, supplied in 1936 by the Drewry Car Co., was supplemented by TR 20-22 and 30-36 in 1939-40. These were powered by Parsons petrol engines. In 1939-40 seven 0-6-0 TRs (the only ones of this type), 23-29, were supplied and were fitted with Leyland  petrol engines Wairarapa railcars. Finally, in 1950 five 0-4-0 TRs, 60-64, with diesel engines were introduced. The locomotives were built at various United Kingdom works including Vulcan Foundry and Robert Stephenson and Hawthorns. Two Drewry TRs are still in service today. This locomotive, TR 56, was KiwiRail's oldest locomotive (being introduced in 1936) and was used at their Hutt Workshops for light shunting duties, until replaced by a battery shunt and transferred to Silver Stream Railway in 2022. TR23 was restored by the Gisborne City Vintage Railway in February 2013 and is still in use by them. TR18 is restored and active at Pleasant Point Museum and Railway.

Rebuilds
 TR 23-29 were re-engined from 1954 with Gardner 8LW engines developing   at 1200 rpm, transmission being a Wilson 4-speed gearbox.
 TR 13-18, 20-22 and 30-36 were re-engined from 1958, and TR 81 in 1968, with the Detroit Diesel 4-71 series engine developing  at 2000 rpm, transmitting through an Allison torque converter.

Hudswell Clarke

Built by Hudswell Clarke originally for the Public Works Department as part of a batch of 12 built in 1936, three locomotives were transferred to NZR, one in 1942, another in 1950 and the final in 1954.

W. G. Bagnall

W G Bagnall built seven TRs in 1956-57. The first five were supplied with McLaren M6 engines, the last two with Gardner 6L3 engines, all with a Self-Changing Gears 4-speed gearbox. The McLaren engines were unsuccessful, so from 1973 TR 150-154 were re-engined with the Gardner 6LX with Twin Disc torque converters. These TRs were the heaviest and one of the more powerful types.

A & G Price

The long-established New Zealand engineering firm A & G Price of Thames supplied a total of 39 TRs, making them the largest single builder. Four different models were supplied: the Model 3 (TR 100-109), with Gardner 6LW engine and self-changing gears, 4-speed gearbox; the Model 9 (TR 110-118), powered by a Gardner 6LW engine and Twin Disc torque converter; the Model 4 (TR 157-161), McLaren M6 engine and SCG 4-speed gearbox; and the Model 6 (TR 162-176), engine Gardner 6L3, also SCG 4-speed gearbox. The McLaren engined TRs were re-powered from 1975 with Gardner 6LX engines and the gearbox was replaced with a Twin Disc torque converter. Three of the A & G Price TRs remain in service.

Hitachi, Japan
In the 1960s Hitachi received an order for six TRs, 177-182, at a time when NZR was turning away from traditional English suppliers and purchasing an increased number of vehicles from Asia. The locomotives were equipped with a Cummins 6-cylinder engine developing  and Niigata torque converter, making them the most powerful TRs. Five of the Hitachi TRs remain in service.

NZR Hillside workshops

The last TRs were manufactured by NZR at its Hillside workshops. Up to two were completed each year between 1973 and 1978 (TR 183-191). The design is an unusual (for a TR) centre-cab style with a single Gardner 6LX engine and Rolls-Royce torque converter. Standard parts such as DSC class windows were utilised in these TRs. Seven of these TRs remain in service.

Liveries 
All TRs were introduced in the Midland Red livery, except the 6 Hitachi built locomotives. In the 1970s all of them had black and yellow chevron safety stripes painted on their headstocks. In the 1980s all of them were repainted into the "International Orange" livery (orange hoods, yellow ends and grey on the cab). TRs 603 and 920 were repainted in Flying Tomato (long and short hoods and cab red and yellow at each end); six were repainted into the Cato Blue (blue body, grey cab and yellow ends) including 943 that received a "one off" being repainted with a blue short and long hoods, blue at each end and grey on the roof of the cab and on top of the hoods; TR 109 was repainted with black and yellow "Chevron Safety Stripes" on the headstocks and along the running boards with yellow that cover most of the long hood with red covering the top quarter; TR 626 was repainted white with yellow headstocks and has the "New Zealand Rail" logo on the front and 718 was also repainted white but this time with red headstocks for the Westland Dairy Company. TRs 56 and 92 were repainted fully yellow with white numbers on each side of their cabs. In 1994 TR 943 was repainted at Hillside Workshops and was repainted in dark blue with black and yellow "Chevron Safety Stripes" on its headstocks. It also had "Transtec Engineering Dunedin" on the side of the long hood.

Table of locomotive specifications

References

Footnotes

Citations

Bibliography

External links
 Oamaru Steam & Rail
 Preserved NZR Diesels
 Preserved NZR Diesels
 NZR Rolling Stock Lists

Tr class
B locomotives
C locomotives
Bagnall locomotives
Preserved diesel locomotives
3 ft 6 in gauge locomotives of New Zealand